André Berezin (born 28 April 1960) is a Brazilian rower. He competed in the men's coxed four event at the 1984 Summer Olympics.

References

External links
 

1960 births
Living people
Brazilian male rowers
Olympic rowers of Brazil
Rowers at the 1984 Summer Olympics
Sportspeople from São Paulo